Benthall is a village in Northumberland, England. It is about 6 kilometres (4 mi) south east of Bamburgh, on the North Sea coast, and 1 kilometre (⅔ mi) south east of Beadnell.

Governance  
Benthall is in the parliamentary constituency of Berwick-upon-Tweed.

References

Villages in Northumberland